Ambryon was an ancient Greek writer who wrote a work on the poet Theocritus, from which Diogenes Laërtius quotes an epigram of Theocritus against Aristotle. His date can only be fixed between the 3rd century BC and the 3rd century AD, and his work itself, On Theocritus, is no longer extant.

See also
Ancient Greek literature

References

Ancient Greek writers known only from secondary sources
Ancient Greek biographers